They Believed He Was No Saint is a 1972 Spanish western film directed by Juan Bosch and starring Anthony Steffen, Daniel Martín and Tania Alvarado. It is scored by Marcello Giombini, and written by Renato Izzo.

Cast
 Anthony Steffen as Trash Benson
 Daniel Martín as Paco
 Tania Alvarado as María
 Manuel Guitián as Jonathan Carver
 Indio González as Preacher
 Ricardo Moyán as Jed Spotless
 Raf Baldassarre as Director de la prisión
 Juan Miguel Solano as Apache Joe
 Antonio Ponciano as Silvertop
 Luis Induni as Travers
 Ángel Lombarte as Melquiades
 Gustavo Re as Padre Javier
 Juan Torres as Aldeano
 Juan Patiño as Hombre de Rojas
 Irene D'Astrea as Molly
 Jarque Zurbano as Sheriff
 Carmen Roger as Chica de Molly
 Fernando Sancho as Fermín Rojas
 Esteban Dalmases as Hombre de Travers
 Juan Antonio Rubio as Pistolero

References

External links
 

Spanish Western (genre) films
Films directed by Juan Bosch
Films produced by Alberto Grimaldi
Films scored by Marcello Giombini
Films shot in Rome
Films shot in Barcelona
Filmax films
1972 Western (genre) films
1972 films
Films with screenplays by Sergio Donati